Bruno Lauzi (8 August 1937 – 24 October 2006) was an Italian singer-songwriter, poet and writer.

Biography

Bruno Lauzi was born in Asmara, then part of the Italian Eastern Africa, to a Catholic father, Francesco Lauzi and a Jewish mother, Laura Nahum. In the 1960s he moved to Genoa, where he became part of the local music scene and met Gino Paoli, Luigi Tenco and Fabrizio De André. After a spell as song writer for Mia Martini, Georges Moustaki and Ornella Vanoni,  Lauzi established himself as a renowned cantautore (singer-songwriter).

His biggest hits include "Ritornerai" (1963),
"Amore caro amore bello" (1972),"Onda su onda" (1974), "Genova per noi" (1975).

In the 1980s he started a political career with the Italian Liberal Party, but without huge success.

Suffering from Parkinson disease, he died in Peschiera Borromeo at age 69 from liver cancer.

He was a football supporter of Unione Calcio Sampdoria.

Discography

 Lauzi al cabaret (1965)
 Ti ruberò (1965)
 Cara (1968)
 Bruno Lauzi (1970)
 Amore caro amore bello (1971)
 Il teatro di Bruno Lauzi (1972)
 Simon (1973)
 Lauzi oggi (1974)
 L'amore sempre (1975)
 Quella gente là (1975)
 Genova per noi (1975)
 Johnny Bassotto, la tartaruga...ed altre storie (1976)
 Persone (1977)
 Alla grande (1978)
 Amici miei (1981, Q-disc)
 Palla al centro (1982)
 Piccolo grande uomo (1985)
 Back to Jazz (1985)
 Ora! (1987)
 La musica del mondo (1988)
 Inventario latino (1989)
 Il dorso della balena (1992)
 Johnny Bassotto e i suoi amici (1996)
 Omaggio alla città di Genova (2001)
 Il manuale del piccolo esploratore (2003)
 Nostaljazz (2003)
 Ciocco Latino (2006)

Literary works

Poems
 I mari interni ("Internal Seas", 1994)
 Riapprodi ("Re-Docks", 1994)
 Versi facili ("Easy Verses", 1999)
 Esercizi di sguardo ("Exercises of Glance", 2002)
 Agli immobili cieli  ("To the Still Skies", 2010)

Prose work
 Della quieta follia dei piemontesi ("On the Quiet Foolery of the Piedmonteses", 1997)
 Il caso del pompelmo levigato  ("The Case of Polished Grapefruit", 2005)
 Tanto domani mi sveglio. Autobiografia in controcanto ("So Tomorrow I Wake Up. Autobiography in Counterpoint", 2006)

References

1937 births
2006 deaths
People from Asmara
Eritrean people of Italian descent
Eritrean emigrants to Italy
Italian  male singer-songwriters
Italian poets
Italian male poets
Musicians from Genoa
Deaths from liver cancer
Deaths from cancer in Lombardy
Italian Liberal Party politicians
20th-century Italian politicians
People with Parkinson's disease
20th-century Italian Jews
Jewish poets
20th-century Italian  male singers
Writers from Genoa